The 7th Meerut Divisional Area was an infantry division of the British Indian Army that formed part of the Indian Army during the First World War.  It was formed in September 1914 to replace the original 7th (Meerut) Division that had been mobilized in August 1914 for service on the Western Front.  It was renamed as Meerut Division in June 1917 and remained in India throughout the war.  The division was broken up in 1920.

History
At the outbreak of the First World War, the 7th (Meerut) Division was mobilized in August 1914 and sailed from Bombay on 20 September for the Western Front. 39th Royal Garhwal Rifles went with the 7th (Meerut) Division to fight in World War One on the Western Front.   The 7th Meerut Divisional Area was formed in September 1914 to take over the area responsibilities of the 7th (Meerut) Division.  It took over the units left behind by the original division and started to form brigades to control them: the 14th (Meerut) Cavalry Brigade in November, the Bareilly and Delhi Brigades in December 1914 and the Dehra Dun Brigade in March 1915.  However, the Garhwal Brigade was not reformed until April 1917.

The division served with in India throughout the war (although the Meerut Cavalry Brigade was mobilized for the Third Anglo-Afghan War in 1919), initially under Northern Army, then Northern Command from January 1918.

In 1918, the division was responsible for posts and stations at Agra, Almora, Bareilly, Bhim Tal, Chakrata, Chambattia, Dehra Dun, Delhi, Gangora, Kailana, Lansdowne, Meerut, Moradabad, Muttra, Ranikhet, Rurki and Sitoli.  It was renamed Meerut Division in June 1917 and was broken up in 1920.

Order of battle
The division commanded the following brigades in the First World War:
 14th (Meerut) Cavalry Brigadeformed in November 1914; renumbered 4th (Meerut) Cavalry Brigade in February 1915
 Bareilly Brigadeformed in December 1914
 Delhi Brigadeformed in December 1914; broken up in February 1915; reformed in December 1918
 Dehra Dun Brigadeformed in March 1915; broken up in December 1918
 Garhwal Brigadeformed in April 1917
 Agra Brigadeformed in December 1918
 Nepalese Brigadeattached to the division from January 1916
 Kali Bahadur Battalion
 Sabuj Barakh Battalion
 Mahindra Dal Battalion
 2nd Rifle Battalion

Commanders
The 7th Meerut Divisional Area / Meerut Division had the following commanders:

See also

 7th (Meerut) Division for the original division
 List of Indian divisions in World War I

Notes

References

Bibliography

External links
 

British Indian Army divisions
Indian World War I divisions
Military units and formations established in 1914
Military units and formations disestablished in 1920